The Hangout Music Festival (commonly referred to as Hangout Fest or Hangout) is an annual three-day music festival held at the public beaches of Gulf Shores, Alabama. It was founded by A.J. Niland and Shaul Zislin in 2010, and is produced by Huka Entertainment. The event features many genres of music, including rock, indie, hip hop, and electronic dance music. It is the first major music festival held on the beach in the city.

Line-ups
All information taken from various sources. Headline performers are listed in Boldface.

2010

The inaugural Hangout Beach Festival was held on May 14–16, 2010. The headliners were Trey Anastasio Band, Zac Brown Band, and John Legend. Other notable performers included: The Roots, Ben Harper and Relentless7, The Black Crowes, Guster, Keller Williams, Alison Krauss and Union Station, Gov’t Mule, Ray Lamontagne, Robert Randolph and The Family Band, Michael Franti and Spearhead, Rodrigo Y Gabriela, Matisyahu, Grace Potter and the Nocturnals, North Mississippi Allstars Duo, Pnuma Trio ALO, Papa Mali, The Whigs, Ozomatli, OK Go, Black Joe Lewis and the Honeybears, Toubab Krewe, Needtobreathe, Jeff Austin & Friends, Moon Taxi, and Girl Talk.

2011
The 2011 Hangout Music Festival took place on May 20–22, 2011. The festival added another stage and began booking larger headlining acts. Attendance had to be capped at 35,000 per day, an unprecedented number for the second year of a music festival in the region, due to safety concerns.  The 2011 event was estimated to have generated approximately $30 million for the Gulf Shores area economy.

Thursday

Friday

Saturday

Sunday

2012
The 2012 festival took place May 18–20, 2012. Advance tickets for the 2012 event, which continued to be capped at 35,000 attendees per day, sold out within one hour.  General admission tickets sold out on February 21, 2012, almost three months prior to the event.

Thursday

Friday

Saturday

Sunday

2013
The 2013 festival took place May 17–19, 2013. The 2013 festival sold out as well, but failed to meet the previous year's "rapid sellout" of general admission tickets.

Thursday

Friday

Saturday

Sunday

2014
The 2014 festival took place May 16–18, 2014. 40,000 tickets were sold, up from the previous audience cap of 35,000. The 2014 festival was the first to allow access to the Gulf of Mexico, which was previously restricted to security and artists.

Thursday

Friday

Saturday

Sunday

2015
The 2015 edition took place May 15–17, 2015.

Friday

Saturday

Sunday

2016
The 2016 edition took place May 19–17, 2016.

Thursday

Friday

Saturday

Sunday

2017
The 2017 edition was held on May 18-21, 2017.

Thursday

Friday

Saturday

Sunday

2018
The 2018 edition was held on May 18-20, 2018.

Friday

The Killers
Zedd
Portugal. The Man
Galantis
Cold War Kids
Blackbear
Oh Wonder
Tash Sultana
Lauv
Lost Kings
Anderson East
Dej Loaf
Pussy Riot
Nothing But Thieves
Banners
Ron Gallo
The Green
The Glorious Sons
Caroline Rose
Bones

Saturday

The Chainsmokers
Halsey
Logic
Anderson .Paak & the Free Nationals
St. Vincent
Grouplove
Bleachers
Manchester Orchestra
Tank and the Bangas
Cashmere Cat
Bahamas
Noname
San Holo
Son Little
Kasbo
Skip Marley
Goldfish
R.LUM.R
Mikky Ekko

Sunday

Kendrick Lamar
SZA
Foster the People
Awolnation
Slightly Stoopid
Lil Pump
The Struts
Getter
NF
Greta Van Fleet
Whethan
Alice Merton
MAX
AJR
Poolside
Hippo Campus
Melvv
Alex Lahey
Welshly Arms
Mansionair
Sunflower Bean
Hotel Garuda

2019
The 2019 edition was held on May 16-19, 2019.

Thursday

Friday

Saturday

Sunday

Notes

References

External links
 Hangout Music Festival

Music festivals in Alabama